Soleyman Chapar (also Romanized as Soleymān Chapar; also known as Soleymān Chūr) is a village in Eshkevar-e Sofla Rural District, Rahimabad District, Rudsar County, Gilan Province, Iran. At the 2006 census, its population was 34, in 9 families.

References 

Populated places in Rudsar County